Michael A. Sadowsky (1902 – December 31, 1967) was a researcher in solid mechanics, particularly the mathematical theory of elasticity and materials science. Born in the Russian Empire, he earned his doctorate in 1927 under the applied mathematician Georg Hamel at the Technical University of Berlin with a dissertation entitled Spatially periodic solutions in the theory of elasticity (in German). He made contributions in the use of potential functions in elasticity and force transfer mechanisms in composites. Many of his early papers were written in German and are now being translated.

Selected publications

with E. Sternberg:

References

External links

Technical University of Berlin alumni
Emigrants from the Russian Empire to Germany
1902 births
1967 deaths
20th-century German mathematicians